The 2021–22 Ukrainian First League was the 31st since its establishment. The league competition consisted of 16 teams. Earlier in 2021 it was discussed to expand the league to 20 teams with discontinuation of the UPL U-21 competitions, but that initiative was not realized.

The competition was terminated at the PFL Council meeting on 6 May 2022 due to the 2022 Russian invasion of Ukraine.

Teams 
This season, Ukrainian First League consisted of 16 teams.

Promoted teams 
The following teams have been promoted from the 2020–21 Ukrainian Second League:
 Podillia Khmelnytskyi – first place in Group A (returning after 22 seasons, however FC Krasyliv that was playing as Podillya Khmelnytskyi last competed in the 2006–07 season)
 Uzhhorod – second place in Group A (debut)
 Metalist Kharkiv – first place in Group B (debut, a phoenix club based on the Second League superfinal champions Metal Kharkiv)
 Kryvbas Kryvyi Rih – second place in Group B (returning after 5 seasons, last competed in the 2015–16 as Hirnyk Kryvyi Rih)

Relegated teams 
The following team has been relegated from the 2020–21 Ukrainian Premier League:
 Olimpik Donetsk – placed 13th (returning after 7 seasons, last competed in the 2013–14)

Renamed teams 
 FC Kramatorsk is a successor of FC Avanhard Kramatorsk which since May 30 was called Avanhard-SK Kramatorsk.
 FC Metalist Kharkiv is a successor of FC Metal Kharkiv.

Location map 
The following displays the location of teams.

Stadiums 

The following stadiums were used as home grounds for the teams in the competition. The minimum capacity for stadiums of the First League clubs is set at 1,500 spectators.

Personnel and sponsorship

Managerial changes

League table

Results

Top goalscorers

Hat-tricks

4 Player scored four goals

Awards

Monthly awards

Round awards

Number of teams by region

See also
 2021–22 Ukrainian Premier League
 2021–22 Ukrainian Second League
 2021–22 Ukrainian Football Amateur League
 2021–22 Ukrainian Cup
 List of Ukrainian football transfers summer 2021

References 

Ukrainian First League seasons
2021–22 in Ukrainian association football leagues
Ukraine
Sports events affected by the 2022 Russian invasion of Ukraine